Pygeum may refer to:
 Pygeum, a former genus of plants, now a subgenus of the genus Prunus
 The extract of Prunus africana, African cherry tree, formerly known as Pygeum africanum